Marie-Luise Jahn (28 May 1918 – 22 June 2010) was a German physician and a member of the anti-Nazi resistance movement White Rose during World War II.

Biography 
Jahn was born in Sandlack, East Prussia (today Sędławki, Poland), where she grew up. From 1934 to 1937, she attended school in Berlin and began her studies in chemistry at the University of Munich in 1940. There Jahn became a close friend of Hans Conrad Leipelt and a member of the White Rose resistance group. After Hans and Sophie Scholl and Christoph Probst had been imprisoned she continued to publish the Scholl leaflets and collected money to aid the widow of Kurt Huber. In October 1943, she was also arrested by the Gestapo for treason and sentenced to 12 years' imprisonment by the Volksgerichtshof in 1944. She served 1.5 years of that sentence before the war ended. 

After her liberation, she studied medicine at the University of Tübingen and worked as a physician in Bad Tölz in Bavaria, Germany. In 1987, she was a founding member of the White Rose Foundation and was a member of the executive board until 2002.

Her conviction was officially overturned on 8 September 2009 by the German Parliament when it cleared all World War II convictions for treason.

Jahn died in Bad Tölz on 22 June 2010, at the age of 92.

Literature 
 Marie-Luise Schultze-Jahn: "... und ihr Geist lebt trotzdem weiter!" - Widerstand im Zeichen der Weißen Rose, Berlin 2003, ISBN 9783936411256

References 

1918 births
2010 deaths
People from East Prussia
People from Bartoszyce County 
Ludwig Maximilian University of Munich alumni
University of Tübingen alumni
White Rose members
Female anti-fascists
People convicted of treason against Germany